

Paleontologists
 A. de Caumont discovers Megalosaurus fossils in the Jurassic oolite of Caen, Normandy. This marks the first recognized dinosaur discovery in France.

References

1820s in paleontology
Paleontology